Solomon "Daddy" Enow (born 18 March 1987) is a Cameroonian footballer who plays as a defender for Italian club Sangiustese. He also holds Italian nationality.

Career
Born in Yaoundé, capital of Cameroon, Enow moved to Italy at young age. Enow was a player for Voghera in 2004–05 and 2005–06 Serie D. He also played for the reserve team of Sampdoria from 2003 to January 2005 and 2006–07 season. In 2007 Enow left for Serie C1 club Gallipoli. On 26 January 2008 Enow moved to Serie C2 club Castelnuovo. In 2008, he was spotted by Legnano. Enow played 26 times in the first edition of Lega Pro Prima Divisione (ex-Serie C1).

Spezia
On 18 July 2009, Enow joined Spezia. Sampdoria gifted the fourth tier club half of the registration rights of Enow and Luca Calzolaio for €500 each. Enow signed a four-year contract. Spezia finished as the runner-up of 2009–10 Lega Pro Seconda Divisione. On 25 June 2010, Sampdoria gave up the remaining 50% registration rights of Calzolaio and Enow to Spezia for free. Enow played  seasons for Spezia in the third tier. On 31 January 2012, Enow left for Lecco. Lecco finished as the losing side of the relegation playoffs of 2011–12 Lega Pro Seconda Divisione, thus relegated to Serie D.

Parma
On 31 August 2012, Enow was signed by Parma F.C. for free. Spezia had signed Lorenzo Crisetig (Parma/Inter), Alessandro Iacobucci (Parma/Siena), Matteo Mandorlini (Brescia/Parma), Stefano Okaka, Mário Rui and Raffaele Schiavi in temporary deals from Parma for free. Enow was immediately left for Romanian club CFR Cluj, but soon left for Unirea Dej. He scored few goals for the Liga III club.

Gorica
In June 2013 Enow was sold to Slovenian club Gorica for €1 million. Uroš Celcer and Alen Jogan also joined Parma for undisclosed fee from Gorica.

Enow signed a three-year contract with Gorica. The paperwork was finalized on 17 July. He was released in summer 2015.

References

External links
AIC profile (data by football.it) 

Cameroonian footballers
U.C. Sampdoria players
A.S.D. Gallipoli Football 1909 players
Spezia Calcio players
Calcio Lecco 1912 players
Parma Calcio 1913 players
ND Gorica players
Serie C players
Slovenian PrvaLiga players
Association football defenders
Cameroonian expatriate footballers
Cameroonian expatriate sportspeople in Italy
Expatriate footballers in Italy
Cameroonian expatriate sportspeople in Romania
Expatriate footballers in Romania
Expatriate footballers in Slovenia
Cameroonian expatriate sportspeople in Slovenia
Footballers from Yaoundé
1987 births
Living people
FC Unirea Dej players
A.C. Sangiustese players